Liv Lindeland (born 7 December 1945 in Norway) is a Norwegian model, actress, and talent agent. She was chosen as Playboy magazine's Playmate of the Month for January 1971 and as the Playmate of the Year for 1972. Her original pictorial was photographed by Alexas Urba. Lindeland is the daughter-in-law of actress-dancer Cyd Charisse.

Career
When the blonde Lindeland was selected to pose for Playboy she became the first Playmate of the Month to show clearly visible pubic hair in the magazine.

Lindeland went into acting following her Playboy appearance (often credited as Liv Von Linden), and then segued into a career as a talent agent. She again posed nude for Playboy in the December 1979 pictorial, "Playmates Forever!"

Filmography
 Evel Knievel (1971)
 Save the Tiger (1973)
 Dirty O'Neil (1974)
 The Photographer (1975)
 Win, Place or Steal (1975)
 Picasso Trigger (1988)
 Guns (1990)

See also
 List of people in Playboy 1970–1979

References

External links 
 

1945 births
Living people
Norwegian film actresses
1970s Playboy Playmates
Playboy Playmates of the Year
Place of birth missing (living people)
Norwegian female models
20th-century Norwegian women